John Ralston Marr was a British Indologist, writer and a former member of faculty at the School of Oriental and African Studies, London. He is known as a scholar of Carnatic music and Tamil literature and is the author of several publications including An introduction to colloquial Tamil, The Pĕriya purāṇam frieze at Tārācuram : episodes in the lives of the Tamil Śaiva saints, The eight Tamil anthologies, with special reference to Pur̲anān̲ūr̲u and Patir̲r̲uppattu and Letterature dravidiche, the last one in Italian language. His book, An introduction to Colloquial Tamil. is a prescribed text for post graduate studies in Tamil language at the School of Oriental and African Languages and he presented a paper at the Fourth International Conference Seminar of Tamil Studies at Jaffna, in 1974. He is a founder trustee of the Bharatiya Vidya Bhavan, UK and a recipient of the 2011 Kural Peedam Award of the Central Institute of Classical Tamil, an autonomous institution under the Ministry of Human Resource Development. The Government of India awarded him the fourth highest civilian honour of the Padma Shri, in 2009, for his contributions to Education.

References

External links

Further reading 
 
 
 
 

Recipients of the Padma Shri in literature & education
British writers
British Indologists
Linguists from the United Kingdom
Academics of SOAS University of London
Alumni of SOAS University of London
Living people
1927 births